The 1997 Bracknell Forest Borough Council election took place on 1 May 1997, to elect all 40 members in 19 wards for Bracknell Forest Borough Council in England.  The election was held on the same day as both the 1997 United Kingdom general election and other local elections in England as part of the 1997 United Kingdom local elections, resulting in a much higher turnout of 75% compared to 1995. With the planned abolition of Berkshire County Council, Bracknell Forest would see itself transition from a district council to a unitary authority a year into the new term.  Despite the landslide victory of the Labour Party in the general election, Bracknell Forest emerged as the only council in the United Kingdom to switch from outright Labour control to outright Conservative control, with the Conservative Party gaining a majority of 6. The Liberal Democrats were wiped out.

Part of the reason for such a dramatic switch was ascribed to the presence of a 'New Labour' slate of candidates.  Irrespective of its name, it was not connected to the New Labour movement, but was led by former Labour group leader John Tompkins. In two wards, where the Conservatives gained 3 councillors from Labour, the margin of victory was smaller than the vote share of the 'New Labour' candidates.  The local Labour Party argued that the similarity of the 'New Labour' name amounted to an attempt at confusing voters and investigated legal action. Former Conservative council leader Alan Ward, who won re-election in Central Sandhurst, surmised that the national Labour Party - both euphoric and preoccupied by its win of government - was not interested in pursuing the case, and the election results were allowed to stand.

Ward results
An asterisk (*) denotes an incumbent councillor standing for re-election

Ascot

Binfield

Bullbrook

Central Sandhurst

College Town

Cranbourne

Crowthorne

Garth

Great Hollands North

Great Hollands South

Hanworth

Harmans Water

Little Sandhurst

Old Bracknell

Owlsmoor

Priestwood

St. Marys

Warfield

Wildridings

By-elections

Harmans Water

Great Hollands South

Footnotes

References

Bracknell Forest Borough Council elections
Bracknell